In Greek mythology, there were two people named Icarius (Ikários).
Icarius, a Spartan prince, son of Perieres.
Icarius, an Athenian who received Dionysus.

See also
Icarus, whose wings failed in flight

Notes

References 

 Apollodorus, The Library with an English Translation by Sir James George Frazer, F.B.A., F.R.S. in 2 Volumes, Cambridge, MA, Harvard University Press; London, William Heinemann Ltd. 1921. ISBN 0-674-99135-4. Online version at the Perseus Digital Library. Greek text available from the same website.

Characters in Greek mythology